Aloke Paul is an Indian materials scientist and a professor at the Department of Materials Engineering of the Indian Institute of Science. Known for his studies on solid state diffusion, Paul is an Alexander von Humboldt Fellow. The Council of Scientific and Industrial Research, the apex agency of the Government of India for scientific research, awarded him the Shanti Swarup Bhatnagar Prize for Science and Technology, the highest Indian science award, for his contributions to engineering sciences in 2017.

Biography 

Aloke Paul did his schooling at B-zone Boys Multipurpose High School and Bidhan Chandra Institution, Durgapur. His under graduate studies were at the Regional Engineering College (currently known as the National Institute of Technology) Durgapur from where he earned the degree of BE in metallurgical engineering in 1996 and proceeded to complete his ME from the Indian Institute of Science, Bengaluru in 1998. Subsequently, he had a stint at Nanyang Technological University, Singapore as a research associate which lasted till 1999. In 2001, he moved to Eindhoven University of Technology, the Netherlands for his doctoral studies under the guidance of Frans J.J. van Loo and A. A. Kodentsov to earn a PhD in 2004. In between, he had a brief stay at Institut für Anorganische Chemie of the University of Vienna, Austria in February 2004. He did his post-doctoral work at University of British Columbia, Vancouver, Canada at their Advanced Materials and Process Engineering Laboratory (AMPEL) during 2004–05 and returned to India in 2005 to take up the position of an assistant professor at his alma mater, Indian Institute of Science. He has been serving IISc ever since, becoming an associate professor in 2010 and a full-time professor in 2016 where he heads the Diffusion in Solids Group. He served Helsinki University of Technology (presently known as the Aalto University), Finland as a visiting professor in 2008 and University of Münster, Germany in 2012 as an Alexander von Humboldt Fellow.

Legacy and honours 
Aloke Paul is known to have made notable contribution in the field of solid state diffusion. While at Eindhoven University of Technology, he was among the group of scientists who made pathbreaking discovery showing previously unknown phenomena related to the Kirkendall effect leading to finer understanding based on new models, which are included in the textbooks.

After joining the Department of Materials Engineering, Indian Institute of Science, his group established the mathematical formalism for physico-chemical approach that quantitatively relates diffusion rates of components with microstructural evolution, an important aspect to understand many physical and mechanical properties of materials.

Prof. Paul's group is currently working on developing new quantitative models which facilitates the estimation of meaningful composition dependent diffusion coefficients in multicomponent systems by tailoring the experiments to counter the complications of mathematical formalism developed based on formalism proposed by Lars Onsager. This was considered impossible otherwise during last many decades.

Several aspects of his work are being included in new textbooks written on solid state diffusion.

Besides, Paul has published four books, a two-volume work, Handbook of Solid State Diffusion, Diffusion in Ni and Fe-Aluminides, Thermodynamics, Diffusion and the Kirkendall Effect in Solids. He is editorial board member of Journal of Electronic Materials, Diffusion Foundations, and Scientific Reports. He is a member of the international advisory panel of Diffusion in Materials (DIMAT) series.

In 2010, Paul received the Outstanding Young Faculty Award of the Indian chapter of Microsoft Research and four years later, the Ministry of Steel of the Government of India selected him as the Metallurgist of the Year Award in 2014.
 The Council of Scientific and Industrial Research awarded him the Shanti Swarup Bhatnagar Prize in 2017, the highest Indian science awards .
In 2020, he was elected as the fellow of Indian Academy of Sciences and in 2023 he was elected as fellow of Indian National Science Academy.

Selected bibliography

Books

See also

List of Shanti Swarup Bhatnagar Prize recipients

Notes

References

External links 
 
 

Recipients of the Shanti Swarup Bhatnagar Award in Engineering Science
Academic staff of the Indian Institute of Science
Indian scientific authors
1973 births
Living people
Indian Institute of Science alumni
Eindhoven University of Technology alumni
University of Vienna alumni
Nanyang Technological University alumni
University of British Columbia alumni
Engineers from West Bengal
Indian materials scientists